Denis Bambrick Cashman (March 1843 – 8 January 1897) was an Irish political prisoner and diarist who was transported to Western Australia due to Fenianism and wrote of his experiences in a diary.

Early life

Cashman was enlisted as a Fenian in 1858, around the age of 16. By the age of 25 he was working as a Law Clerk in Waterford.

On January 12, 1867, Cashman was arrested (the same day his third child was born) and was brought to trial on February 19, 1867 where he pleaded guilty to treason, he was sentenced to seven years penal servitude. He was first transported to Millibank Prison where he awaited transportation to Australia aboard the Hougoumont.

Transportation

During the journey Cashman kept a diary detailing the day-to-day activities aboard ship and proving a detailed account of the feelings of the convicts and prisoners on the ship. Cashman was also involved in the production of The Wild Goose, the onboard newspaper.

Life in United States

Like many civilian Fenians, Cashman was pardoned on the 15 May 1869. In late October 1869, he and 14 other Fenians boarded the ship Baringa and sailed from Sydney, Australia to San Francisco, California. He took the Central Pacific Railroad out of California and headed to Boston to meet up with his wife Catherine, his son William, and his good friend and fellow Fenian John Boyle O'Reilly.

While in Boston, he worked in the book and publishing department, and later as the business manager of the Boston Pilot. He worked as a top salesman of Donahoe's Magazine, and later as the superintendent of Waste Water Department in Boston.<ref>Sullivan III, C. W. Fenian diary: Denis B. Cashman on board the Hougoumont, Dublin: Wolfhound Press, 2001: pp. 27-29.</ref>

Cashman was involved in the initial stages of planning the Catalpa rescue of 6 Fenians from Western Australia.  After hatching the scheme with Thomas McCarthy Fennell, John Devoy, the well known leader of the Clan na Gael traveled to Boston to meet with John Boyle O'Reilly and Cashman.

As former prisoners—the two Bostonians had intimate knowledge of the inner workings of the Fremantle Prison and their contributions helped lead to the success of the rescue mission. Cashman strongly supported agrarian agitation in Ireland. In 1881, he published the first biography of Michael Davitt, a founder of the Irish National Land League. Cashman's The Life of Michael Davitt was published the same year Davitt was again imprisoned for after he accused the chief secretary of Ireland W. E. Forster of "infamous lying".

Cashman was the pall-bearer at O'Reilly's funeral on August 13, 1890.

Death
Cashman died from heart disease in his Boston home on 8 January 1897, he was survived by his wife Catherine and 3 children.

Diary
His diary was donated to East Carolina University where Professor of English Charles Sullivan III edited it and in this form it was published in 2003. The diary contains poems by Cashman, John Boyle O'Reilly and John Flood. The diary is currently housed in the East Carolina Manuscript Collection in Joyner Library at East Carolina University.

In the arts
 Musician and local  historian Brendan Woods  authored a play about the breakout, The Catalpa''. On 15 November 2006, it premiered to a sellout audience at Fremantle Town Hall, and ran until 25 November. The play is based on Cashman's diaries with poetry by John Boyle O'Reilly set to music and dance.

See also
List of convicts transported to Australia
Catalpa rescue

References

External links
Biography, waterfordcountymuseum.org; accessed 24 August 2017.

Convicts transported to Western Australia
Members of the Irish Republican Brotherhood
1843 births
1897 deaths
Recipients of British royal pardons
Date of birth unknown